Hodor is a fictional character from the epic fantasy novel series A Song of Ice and Fire and its TV adaptation, Game of Thrones.

Hodor may also refer to:

 Hodor Fakih, a Bulgarian-Lebanese surgeon
 An alternative spelling of al-Hudfir, Oman

See also
 Höðr, a Norse god
 Hoder (disambiguation)
 Hodder (disambiguation)